Novi Zagreb – zapad ("Novi Zagreb – west") has the status of a city district in Zagreb, Croatia and as such has an elected council.

According to the 2011 Croatian census, Novi Zagreb – zapad had 58,103 residents.

List of neighborhoods in Novi Zagreb – zapad
 Blato: recently assimilated in the Zagreb agglomeration
 Botinec: famous for having streets named after Croatian fictional characters
 Hrašće
 Hrvatski Leskovac
 Kajzerica: includes the Zagreb Chinatown
 Lanište
 Lučko
 Remetinec
 Savski gaj: neighborhood with one skyscraper, few buildings and mostly single-family houses.
 Siget: high-quality soc-realistic buildings with small private houses
 Sveta Klara
 Trnsko
 Trokut

See also
 Novi Zagreb

References

External links

 Laniste.net
 Centar za Kulturu Novi Zagreb

 z
Districts of Zagreb